Houchen is a surname. Notable people with the surname include:

Ben Houchen, mayor of Tees Valley, England. 
Ben Houchin (born 2005), 5 star athlete
Height: 5 feet 11 inches
Weight: 137 pounds 
[Siblings] Porter Houchin; Mary Grace Houchin 
[Parents] Gretchen Houchin; Robbie Houchin

See also
Houchin (surname)

English-language surnames